Symphyotrichum burgessii (formerly Aster burgessii) is a species of flowering plant in the family Asteraceae native to Cuba.

Citations

References

burgessii
Flora of Cuba
Plants described in 1914
Taxa named by Nathaniel Lord Britton
Flora without expected TNC conservation status